Greensleeves Rhythm Album #3: Doorslam is an album in Greensleeves Records' rhythm album series.  It was released in June 2000 on CD and LP.  The album features various artists recorded over the "Doorslam" riddim, produced by Harvel Hart for Annex Productions.

Track listing
"Bust It" - Capleton
"Cool Bwoy" - Beenie Man
"Heard Of Dem" - Sizzla
"No One Cares" - Bounty Killer & Merciless
"Blank" - Lexxus
"This Means War" - Ward 21
"One" - Elephant Man
"More Gun" - Mr. Vegas
"Who Dem A Send" - Harry Toddler
"Ganja Man" - Hawkeye
"Screechie Pon Mi Toe" - Danny English
"Fleety Flighty" - Chico
"Rubbers" - Goofy
"20 Weed Commandments" - General B
"More Bun" - Mr. Vegas
"Good" - Zaro
"Load Up" - Alozade
"Badness" - Kiprich
"Lose Dem Way" - Fargo Voice
"Living Years" - Ghost

2000 compilation albums
Reggae compilation albums
Greensleeves Records albums